Mythimna favicolor, or Mathew's wainscot, is a moth of the family Noctuidae. The species was first described by Charles Golding Barrett in 1896. It is found in Europe (Britain, Denmark, Germany, the Netherlands). The species is sometimes treated as a subspecies of Mythimna pallens, the common wainscot.

Technical description and variation

S. favicolor Bart. Forewing pale olive brown ; veins concolorous, slightly defined by brown ; the intervals at termen with brown streaks; a small black dot at lower end of cell; an outer row of black dots on veins, sometimes reduced to two only, on veins 2 and 5 ; hindwing fuscous whitish ; - ab. lutea Tutt  is paler and yellowish; — in ab. rufa Tutt the head, thorax, and forewings are bright rufous; abdomen and hindwing tinged with rufous; — argillacea Tutt has the forewing greyish luteous, the fringe pink; hindwing
Larva pinkish ochreous reticulated with darker; dorsal line pale, narrow, with darker edges: subdorsal greyish white; a broader grey stripe above the spiracles and a pinkish ochreous one below.

Similar species
Mythimna favicolor is difficult to certainly distinguish from its congeners. See Townsend et al. for genitalia images and an identification key.
Mythimna straminea (Treitschke, 1825) 
Mythimna impura (Hübner, 1808) 
Mythimna pallens (Linnaeus, 1758)

Biology
The moth flies from June to July depending on the location.
The larvae feed on Puccinellia maritima.

References

Mythimna (moth)
Moths described in 1896
Moths of Europe